Moro is an East Kainji language of Nigeria belonging to the Shammo cluster.

Distribution
Moro is spoken in Plateau, Bauchi, Kaduna, and Kano states. There are about 20 villages, which are:

Villages in Toro LGA, Bauchi State: Danka, Dankarau, Doka Limoro, Falingu, Girya, Pindel, Yada Bongo
Villages in Kauru LGA, Kaduna State: Kauru Taru, Kuzuntu
Villages in Lere LGA, Kaduna State: Lezuru, Marmara, Sabon cini
Villages in Doguwa LGA, Kano State: Lemu, Nasarawa
Villages in Bassa LGA, Plateau State: Abubu, Bishen kafe, Gitu, Gondoŋ, Kabake, Katirbi, Kazongo, Legeng, Orade, Ɔkɛma, Ɔsɛ, Rema

References

East Kainji languages
Languages of Nigeria